was an officer in the Imperial Japanese Army imprisoned for his involvement in the Amakasu Incident, the extrajudicial execution of anarchists after the 1923 Great Kantō earthquake, who later became head of the Manchukuo Film Association.

Biography 
Amakasu was born in Miyagi Prefecture as the eldest son of a samurai of the Yonezawa Domain under the bakufu. The caste system in Japan where society was divided into merchants, artisans, peasants and samurai was abolished in 1871 as one of the Meiji era reforms, but long afterwards, caste distinctions persisted with those of the samurai caste being disproportionately over-represented in the officer corps of the Imperial Navy and Army right up to 1945. Amakasu was educated in military boarding schools in Mie Prefecture and Nagoya, and entered the Imperial Japanese Army Academy in 1912. After graduation, he served in the infantry and then the military police in various postings in Japan and in Korea.

On September 16, 1923, when Amakasu was a lieutenant in charge of a detachment of the Kenpeitai military police during the chaos immediately following the 1923 Great Kantō earthquake of September 1, he and his officers arrested the well-known anarchists Sakae Ōsugi and Noe Itō, along with Sakae's six-year-old nephew, Munekazu Tachibana. In what came to be known as the Amakasu Incident, the suspects were beaten to death and their bodies thrown into a well. The killing of such high-profile anarchists, along with a young child, sparked surprise and outrage throughout Japan. Amakasu was court martialed and sentenced to serve 10 years in Chiba Prison.<ref>Jansen, Marius B. (2000). The Making of Modern Japan, p. 573.</ref>

However, Amakasu was released after only three years due to a general amnesty proclaimed in celebration of the ascension of Hirohito as Emperor of Japan. After his release, Amakasu was sent to France to study by the Japanese Army from July 1927. While in France, he became acquainted with the noted artist Tsuguharu Foujita. He returned to Japan in 1930, but almost immediately relocated to Mukden in Manchuria, where he worked under Japanese spymaster Kenji Doihara to manage the Japanese Army's increasing involvement in opium production and smuggling into China. After Manchurian Incident, he relocated to Harbin, where he was involved in the effort to smuggle ex-Qing emperor Puyi from the foreign concession in Tianjin into Manchuria, where he would become the puppet ruler of the new state of Manchukuo. When Puyi landed in Port Arthur in November 1931, it was Amakasu who greeted him at the dock and escorted him to the train that took him to the Yamato Hotel. While on the train, Amakasu boasted to Puyi about how he had killed Itō, Ōsugi and Tachibana because they were "enemies of the Emperor", and that he would gladly kill Puyi himself if he should prove to be an "enemy of the Emperor". In Manchukuo, Amakasu helped establish the civilian police force in the new capital of Hsinking as the city of Changchun had been renamed. During his time in Manchukuo, Amakasu was notorious for his brutality, and the American historian Louise Young described Amakasu as a "sadistic" man who enjoyed torturing and killing people.  In 1934, at Puyi's coronation as Emperor of Manchukuo, Amkasu again played the role of Puyi's minder under the guise of serving as the director of the film crew that recorded the coronation. After the Marco Polo Bridge Incident in 1937, which marked the beginning of the war with China, Amakasu played a prominent role in undercover operations against China.

In 1939, with the support of Nobusuke Kishi, he was named the head of Manchukuo Film Association, which was one of the main propaganda vehicles for the Kwantung Army to boost public support for Manchukuo and for the war effort against the Kuomintang government of China. Amakasu strove hard to improve the quality of the works produced, traveling to Germany to acquire the latest movie cameras and production techniques, and inviting noted Japanese movie stars, directors and conductors (such as Takashi Asahina) to visit Manchukuo and to participate in his productions. His efforts were instrumental in launching the career of Yoshiko Ōtaka, better known as "Ri Kōran" in Japanese.

In 1940, Amakasu produced , which become the most popular Japanese film of that year. Starring Yoshiko Yamaguchi, a Japanese actress who had grown in China and was fluent enough in Mandarin as Chinese, the film told the story of a Chinese woman Kei Ran whose parents had been killed in the war by a Japanese bombing raid and was violently anti-Japanese as a result. A handsome and caring young Japanese naval officer Tetsuo Hase falls in love with her, but she resists his advance until he violently slaps her face, despite her tears and begging him to stop, and after which she declares her love for him. After being slapped into declaring her love, she apologizes for anti-Japanese statements, and in a true Pan-Asian union, the two are married and lived happily ever after. The film was and still is very controversial in China, with most Chinese feeling especially humiliated by the face slapping scene with its suggestion that all one has to do is slap around a Chinese woman to make her love one. The Japanese historian Hotta Eri argued the cultural nuances of Shina no yoru were lost on Chinese audiences. In Japan, as part of a ploy to infantize the population, the Emperor was always portrayed as a hermaphrodite figure, being both the mother and the father of nation at the same time, with his/her loving subjects as perpetual children unable to think very much for themselves, thus requiring the Emperor as the parent of the nation to do all the necessary thinking for his/her loving subjects. At the same time, the Emperor as a god had such awesome responsibilities to deal with that he had to delegate some of his power down to mere humans so he could focus on more important matters. In both the Imperial Japanese Army and Navy, officers routinely slapped the faces of the men under their command when giving orders, which was portrayed not as an exercise in petty humiliation, but as an act of love, with His Imperial Majesty's officers acting as the surrogates for the Emperor, who had to discipline his "children" by having their faces slapped all the time. Hotta wrote that the scene where the Japanese hero slaps the face of the Chinese woman until she declares her love for him was seen in Japan as a romantic gesture, as a sign he cared for her, just in the same way that officers of the Imperial Army and Navy showed the Emperor's "love" for his subjects serving in his Army and Navy by slapping their faces all the time. Yamaguchi herself in a 1987 interview stated she did not feel the controversial face-slapping scene was an exercise in humiliation for her character, calling it a very romantic and moving scene. However, Hotta observed that Amakasu did project a Pan-Asian message in the film, with its Chinese heroine marrying the Japanese hero, and moreover, it is clear that the Japanese hero is the dominant partner in their relationship, which was meant as a metaphor for the relationship Amakasu wanted to see between Japan and China.

With the fall of Manchukuo to Soviet forces during the invasion of Manchuria in August 1945, Amakasu committed suicide by taking potassium cyanide. On the last day of his life, Amakasu wrote out a suicide note in his office and swallowed a cyanide pill.

In popular culture

Amakasu was portrayed by Japanese musician Ryuichi Sakamoto in the 1987 film The Last Emperor, although he was shown shooting himself to death in the movie.
Amakasu is also a character in the historical fantasy novel Teito Monogatari by Hiroshi Aramata.  In the novel, he is involved with the freemasons.
Amakasu was featured as a character in Ian Buruma's novel The China Lover, released in 2008.
Amakasu is a main character in Christian Kracht's 2016 novel The Dead''.

See also 

 Amakasu Incident
 Manchukuo Film Association

Notes

References 
 ;  OCLC 44090600
 
 

1891 births
1945 deaths
Drug-related suicides in China
Military personnel from Miyagi Prefecture
People of Manchukuo
Suicides by cyanide poisoning